Koster's tryonia, scientific name Tryonia kosteri, is a species of small freshwater snail with a gill and an operculum, an aquatic gastropod mollusk in the family Hydrobiidae.

Distribution
This species is endemic to New Mexico in the United States.

References

External links 
 US Fish and Wildlife service info

Molluscs of the United States
Tryonia
Endemic fauna of New Mexico
Gastropods described in 1987
Taxonomy articles created by Polbot
ESA endangered species